Zsuzsa Ferge is a Hungarian sociologist and statistician who is particularly known for her work on poverty reduction. She is a Professor Emerita in the Department of Policy, Economics, and Law at Eötvös Loránd University, where she helped to establish a department of social policy studies. She has also been the head of the Poverty Research Center there, as well as the Chief Researcher at the Working Unit on Hungary's National Program against Child Poverty, holding both of these positions after her retirement.

Life and career
Ferge is a Professor Emerita in the Department of Policy, Economics, and Law at Eötvös Loránd University, where she became a full professor in 1988. She has been credited with establishing the social policy studies department there. She retired to become a professor emerita in 2001, but after that she continued to head the university's Poverty Research Center.

Methodologically, Ferge's academic work has focused on statistical sociology. She focuses on poverty in Hungary, and particularly on the collection and analysis of sociological data regarding child poverty. She has also engaged in extensive activism to reduce child poverty in Hungary, and she specializes in the interaction of government policy and poverty.

In 1998, Ferge was made a member of the Hungarian Academy of Sciences. In 1993, she was elected to the Academia Europaea.

In 2002, Ferge was awarded the Middle Cross of the Order of Merit of the Republic of Hungary. In 2007 she was the winner of the Hungarian Government's Imre Nagy Order of Merit (hu), and in 2009 she won the Government of Hungary's Twenty Years of the Republic Award (hu). Ferge was a 2010 recipient of the European Citizens' Prize. In 2011, Ferge won the Lifetime Achievement Award from the Hungarian Sociological Society. She also holds an honorary doctorate from the University of Edinburgh.

Selected awards
Middle Cross, Order of Merit of the Republic of Hungary (2002) 
Imre Nagy Order of Merit (2007)
Twenty Years of the Republic Award (2009)
European Citizens' Prize (2010)
Lifetime Achievement Award, Hungarian Sociological Society (2011)
Honorary doctorate, University of Edinburgh

References

Living people
Hungarian sociologists
Hungarian women sociologists
Hungarian statisticians
Women sociologists
Women statisticians
Recipients of the Order of Merit of the Republic of Hungary
Year of birth missing (living people)
Recipients of the European Citizen's Prize